Darryl Howland (born 18 February 1943) is a former  Australian rules footballer who played with South Melbourne in the Victorian Football League (VFL).

Notes

External links 

Living people
1943 births
Australian rules footballers from Victoria (Australia)
Sydney Swans players
Dimboola Football Club players